Events in the year 2020 in Djibouti.

Incumbents 

 President: Ismaïl Omar Guelleh
 Prime Minister: Abdoulkader Kamil Mohamed

Events 
Ongoing — COVID-19 pandemic in Djibouti; 2020 East Africa floods

 18 March – The first confirmed COVID-19 case is detected when a member of the Spanish Special Forces who arrived on 14 March for Operation Atalanta tested positive.
 9 April  – Djibouti recorded its first coronavirus death.
 4 October – Eight migrants are dead, while 12 more are missing, after three unidentified smugglers hijacked their boat off the coast of Djibouti, according to eyewitnesses and the International Organization for Migration. The agency reports that the migrants had attempted to reach Saudi Arabia via Yemen, but were forced to return to the Horn of Africa due to COVID-19 pandemic-related travel restrictions.

Sports 

 27 December 2019 – 5 September 2020: 2019–20 Djibouti Premier League
 11 December 2020 – 24 April 2021: 2020–21 Djibouti Premier League

Deaths 

 23 June – Xabiiba Cabdilaahi, 58, singer

References 

 
2020s in Djibouti
Years of the 21st century in Djibouti
Djibouti
Djibouti